Corynebacterium glutamicum is a Gram-positive, rod-shaped bacterium that is used industrially for large-scale production of amino acids. While originally identified in a screen for organisms secreting L-glutamate, mutants of C. glutamicum have also been identified that produce various other amino acids.

Due to its industrial importance, several clones of C. glutamicum have been sequenced by both industry and academic groups. Furthermore, small RNA data was obtained by RNA-Seq in C. glutamicum ATCC 13032. The metabolism of this strain has been reconstructed and is available in the form of a genome-scale metabolic model.

See also
 List of sequenced bacterial genomes

References

External links 
 Genome sequence for C. glutamicum from NCBI.
 Type strain of Corynebacterium glutamicum at BacDive - the Bacterial Diversity Metadatabase

Gram-positive bacteria
Corynebacterium